Leccinum vulpinum, commonly known as the foxy bolete, is a bolete fungus in the genus Leccinum that is found in Europe. It was described as new to science by Roy Watling in 1961. An edible species, it grows in mycorrhizal association with species of pine and bearberry.

See also
List of Leccinum species

References

vulpinum
Fungi described in 1961
Fungi of Europe
Edible fungi
Taxa named by Roy Watling